, birth name Zhang Tianjie, is a Chinese-born Japanese professional basketball player. He currently plays for the Nagoya Diamond Dolphins club of the B.League in Japan.

He represented Japan's national basketball team at the 2017 FIBA Asia Cup, where he was Japan's best free throw shooter (free throws made).

Personal
Harimoto is from a family of diverse athletes. His father was a basketball player, his mother was a volleyball player, his grandfather was a fencing coach, and his uncle was a badminton player.

References

External links
FIBA profile
 FIBA Asia Cup 2017 profile
 Asia-basket.com profile
 Real GM profile
Profile at Proballers
Profile at AiScore

1992 births
Living people
Alvark Tokyo players
Small forwards
Japanese men's basketball players
Basketball players from Shenyang
Nagoya Diamond Dolphins players
Asian Games bronze medalists for Japan
Asian Games medalists in basketball
Basketball players at the 2014 Asian Games
Basketball players at the 2018 Asian Games
Naturalized citizens of Japan
Chinese emigrants to Japan
Medalists at the 2014 Asian Games
Basketball players at the 2020 Summer Olympics
Olympic basketball players of Japan
Japanese sportspeople of Chinese descent